Karl Ludwig Felix Machatschki (22 September 1895 – 17 February 1970) was an Austrian mineralogist. 

He was born in Arnfels (near Leibnitz) in Styria, Austria. He studied at the University of Graz, obtaining his habilitation in 1925; in 1927 he joined the group of Victor Goldschmidt in Oslo for one year. In 1930 he was appointed as a professor at the University of Tübingen. He changed university twice, first in 1941 to the University of Munich and finally in 1944 to the University of Vienna. 

In 1928 he published Zur Frage der Struktur und Konstitution der Feldspäte, a paper in which he develops the concept of the atomic structure of silicates and formulates the construction principle of feldspars. In 1946 he published Grundlagen der allgemeinen Mineralogie und Kristallchemie ("Fundamentals of general mineralogy and crystal chemistry").

In 1961, Machatschki was awarded the Austrian Medal for Science and Art. The "Felix-Machatschki-Preis" is an award given by the Österreichische Mineralogische Gesellschaft in recognition of outstanding international scientific work in the field of mineralogy. The mineral machatschkiite commemorates his name.

Published works 
 Grundlagen der allgemeinen Mineralogie und Kristallchemie, 1946 – Fundamentals of general mineralogy and crystal chemistry.
 Vorräte und Verteilung der mineralischen Rohstoffe, 1948 – Inventories and the distribution of mineral resources. 
 Spezielle Mineralogie auf geochemischer Grundlage, 1953 – Special mineralogy on a geochemical basis.
He was also the author of 140 individual articles in scientific journals.

References

External links 
 Source of this translation

1895 births
1970 deaths
Austrian chemists
Austrian mineralogists
University of Graz alumni
Academic staff of the University of Tübingen
Academic staff of the University of Vienna
Academic staff of the Ludwig Maximilian University of Munich
People from Leibnitz District
Recipients of the Austrian Decoration for Science and Art